Advertising Women of New York, Inc. (AWNY), originally called the League of Advertising Women of New York, was the first organization solely for women in the advertising and communications industry in America.

Description
Although women had been members of advertising agencies since the late 19th century, with some women owning their own agencies and trade publications, AWNY was the first official association for advertising women. It would inspire the foundation of several other female advertising organizations around the country.

AWNY was founded in 1912 by journal editors Christine Frederick and J. George Frederick as a response to women's denial from the all-male Advertising League. Its primary objectives were to educate its members in advertising and to encourage the active involvement of women in the advertising industry. Beginning in the 1930s, the club held classes and dinners with speakers on advertising and business practices, and awarded scholarships to girls to help them pursue degrees in advertising. During World War II, they also helped with the economizing campaign.

Today the organization consists of more than 1,500 women and men representing the advertising, marketing, media, promotion and public relations fields, and is an affiliate of the American Advertising Federation. Its mission is to provide a forum for personal and professional growth; to serve as a catalyst for the advancement of women in the communications field; and in keeping with its longtime mission of social consciousness, to promote and support philanthropic endeavors through the AWNY Foundation. The organization hosts 35 events a year, including several "signature" events such as the Advertising Woman of the Year Luncheon and the Advertising Career Conference.

Notes

References
Fox, Stephen (1984). The Mirror Makers: A History of American Advertising and Its Creators. New York: Morrow.
Frederick, Christine (1929). Selling Mrs. Consumer. New York: The Business Bourse.
Marchand, Roland (1985). Advertising the American Dream: Making Way for Modernity, 1920-1940. Berkeley: University of California Press.
Sivulka, Juliann (2009). Ad Women: How They Impact What We Need, Want and Buy. Amherst, NY: Prometheus Books.
Vega, Tanzina. "AdAge Honors Influential Women in the Industry." New York Times, September 23, 2012. https://www.nytimes.com/2012/09/24/business/media/advertising-age-honors-influential-women-in-the-industry.html?_r=0

External links
Records, 1912-1970. Schlesinger Library, Radcliffe Institute, Harvard University.

Women of New York
Women's organizations based in the United States
Advertising in the United States
1912 establishments in New York City
Organizations established in 1912
Sculptures of women in New York City